The 2021 Jeddah Formula 2 round was the seventh and penultimate round of the 2021 Formula 2 Championship and occurred at the Jeddah Corniche Circuit from 3 to 5 December. It was run in support of the 2021 Saudi Arabian Grand Prix and featured three races. The feature race was marred by the crash between Théo Pourchaire and Enzo Fittipaldi where both were hospitalised.

However, Prema Racing sealed the Teams' Championship after their drivers Oscar Piastri and Robert Shwartzman secured a double win in the Feature Race, making them the first double teams' champion in Formula 2 history.

Classification

Qualifying

Sprint race 1 

 Notes：

  - Jehan Daruvala originally finished the race in fifth place, but was awarded a five-second time penalty for gaining a lasting advantage by going off the track when overtaking his teammate Dan Ticktum. Thus, he was classified tenth.
  - Olli Caldwell was given a ten-second time penalty for colliding with Marino Sato and Guilherme Samaia on lap 1, which dropped him from 16th to 18th.

Sprint race 2 

Notes：

  - Jehan Daruvala received a five-second time penalty for gaining a lasting advantage by shortcutting turn one when he was defending against Oscar Piastri, thus dropping him down from second to 14th.
  - Christian Lundgaard got a five-second time penalty for gaining an advantage by shortcutting the first corner when overtaking Bent Viscaal, which dropped him from third to 15th.

Feature race 

Notes：

 Originally scheduled for 28 laps, 5 laps were completed.
Since 75% of the predetermined distance has not been completed, only half of the points were earned in this race.
 - Clément Novalak received a three-place grid drop for causing a collision with Marcus Armstrong in sprint race 2.

Standings after the event 

Drivers' Championship standings

Teams' Championship standings

 Note: Only the top five positions are included for both sets of standings.

See also 
2021 Saudi Arabian Grand Prix

References

External links 
 

Jeddah
2021 in Saudi Arabian sport
Jeddah Formula 2